Highley is a large village in Shropshire, England, on the west bank of the River Severn and 7 miles south east of Bridgnorth. The closest cities being Wolverhampton and Birmingham.

History
Highley began as a rural farming community, including an entry in the Domesday Book, later becoming a significant area for stone quarrying which provided some of the stone for Worcester Cathedral. Coal mining began in the area in the Middle Ages, but in the late 19th century the village was revolutionised by coal mining with large-scale operations beginning in 1878. A period of intense house-building also followed, giving Highley its distinctive red-brick terraced miners' houses. In the 1930s, the mine was extended to the neighbouring village of Alveley across the River Severn and a tunnel and bridge constructed between the two. There are also historical bridging points at Bridgnorth to the north and Bewdley to the south, and in Hampton Loade a private bridge used by the emergency services.

The mine closed in the late 1960s due to subsidence and waterlogging. The bridge remained open to bridleway traffic only, due to subsidence from the steep valley sides. The mine area on the Alveley (east) side was converted into an industrial estate in the late 1960s as coal mining ceased, and subsequently landscaped into the Severn Valley Country Park in the late 1980s. Initially this was as an exercise to use trees to shore up the coal spoils, and later as a tourist destination which now includes public artwork and a sculpture trail, the Seam Pavement Trail.

The trail is a series of seven bronze plaques depicting Highley's past and incorporates the designs of West Midlands artist Saranjit Birdi. He included many miner's nicknames into the artwork, gleaned from archive information and research within the local community. Nicknames of the miners, such as Dick the Devil, Joyful Clappers, Cider Biscuit, Flaming Heck and others, are incorporated into the work. Birdi calls it "a seam through time", echoing the skilfully mined coal seams being laid down and later extracted over time. One plaque, Plough and Lady, depicts Lady Godiva, who owned Highley Manor in the 11th century. Birdi is also responsible for another sculpture, A Song of Steam, at Highley station.

In 2000, the bridge was declared unsafe and a new footbridge constructed (completed 2006).

Highley was the village where 17-year-old murder victim Lesley Whittle lived, and from which she was abducted by Donald Neilson, the Black Panther, in 1975. Lesley, the daughter of coach firm owner George Whittle (1905–1970), was taken from her home on 13 January 1975 and found dead on an underground ledge beneath Bathpool Park near Kidsgrove, Staffordshire, on 7 March that year. Neilson was found guilty of murdering Lesley Whittle and three other people (as well as wounding a Dudley security guard, who later died having never fully recovered from his injuries) at his trial in the summer of 1976, and sentenced to life imprisonment.

Transport
Highley has two stops on the Severn Valley Railway, at Highley Station and Country Park Halt.

The main railway stop is a substantial sandstone Victorian railway station. The station is also home to a museum of village life, housed within a vintage post office sorting carriage and home of the Engine Shed which houses a collection of heritage locomotives, a gift shop and a café. Down a small flight of steps from Highley railway station is the Ship Inn Public House, and from there a public footpath leads back to the Country Park and to the Severn Way waymarked walk.

The other stop is an unmanned request halt near the bridge for the Country Park. Passengers wishing to board the train at the halt stop the train by holding out their hand, as if hailing a bus, and those wishing to alight are advised to speak to the guard of the train before it leaves the previous station.

There is also bus service through the village, operated by Diamond West Midlands. The 125  bus service operates Mondays to Saturdays, from Bridgnorth to Stourbridge.

In January 2020 it was reported that the GP surgery in the village was having trouble recruiting locum doctors because of potholes on the way in to the surgery on Bridgnorth Road. In November 2022 the current providers of NHS services to the community at Highley Medical Centre announced they would be ending their contract there in March 2023, consultation is currently ongoing to secure new providers at the location.

Culture and community
Highley houses the Severn Centre,a sports and leisure complex complete with heated lido (open-air swimming pool) that also includes the local library, football ground and cricket pitch. (Latter frequently used to exercise dogs despite dogs being banned.) There is also a Country Park, the sculpture trail plus several restaurants and pubs. A Steam Heritage Centre has been proposed.

Highley Colliery Brass Band 
The Highley Colliery Brass Band is a local brass band which existed from the turn of the 19th Century until the closure of the colliery in 1969. It reformed in 1993 when a handful of brass band musicians met at the Bache Public House in Highley. The band adopted regular rehearsals, meeting every Wednesday and Sunday night at the Bache Arms. Member numbers grew, and under the baton of Ray Millichamp the Band began performances under the name of Highley Band. In 2000 to coincide with the new uniform, the band adopted the now familiar Pit Head Wheel emblem and renamed the band to Highley Colliery Band, to reflect the mining heritage of its home village.

The band sees itself as a social group as well as a musical organisation. The band has members of all ages, young and old. The younger members especially are encouraged to take their music grades, and endeavours to enhance every player's musical ability and enjoyment. The band performs at fetes, parks and concerts throughout the country. The band used to rehearse at the Castle Inn until it closed every Wednesday and Sunday.

Notable people 
 Aubrey Scriven (1904 in Highley – c.1988) an English professional footballer, he made over 200 pro appearances for Birmingham, Bradford City and Bristol City
 Gerry Hitchens (1934-1983), footballer, notably for Aston Villa and England international, was miner at Highley colliery
 Stan Jones (born 1938) footballer, mainly Walsall and WBA
 Colin Hemsley (born 1949 in Highley) an English former cricketer, he played for Shropshire
 David Tristram (born 1957) an English comic playwright, he lives in Highley
 Mark Humphries (born 1965 in Highley) a former English cricketer, he played for Staffordshire

See also
Listed buildings in Highley

References

External links

 Highley Colliery Band Site
 Highley Village Site
 Village website
 The Severn Centre
 The Engine House
 Highley Station Site
 Highley RFC

Villages in Shropshire
Populated places on the River Severn
Civil parishes in Shropshire